MRC may refer to

Government
 Medical Research Council (United Kingdom)
 Medical Reserve Corps, a US network of volunteer organizations
 Municipalité régionale de comté (regional county municipality), Quebec, Canada
 Military Revolutionary Committee, in revolutionary Russia
 Virginia Marine Resources Commission
 Mail recovery center, or postal dead letter office
 The Mississippi River Commission

Organizations
 Malaysian Red Crescent Society, a humanitarian organisation
 Media Research Center, a US organization
 Media Rating Council, a US organization
 Medicare Rights Center, a US nonprofit organization
 Migrant Resource Centre, an Australian organisation

Politics
 Mombasa Republican Council, a Kenyan separatist organization
 Movement for the Rehabilitation of Citizens–Rurenzangemero, a Burundi political party
 Mouvement républicain et citoyen (Citizen and Republican Movement), a French political party
 Mouvement Révolutionnaire Congolais (Congolese Revolutionary Movement), a rebel group in the Democratic Republic of the Congo

Sports
 Manchester Rugby Club
 Melbourne Racing Club, a thoroughbred horse racing club
 Montreal Rowing Club
 Mosman Rowing Club, in Sydney, Australia

Science and technology
 Maximal-ratio combining, a method of encoding signals in telecommunications 
 Minimum resolvable contrast, a measurement associated with imaging devices
 Mixed raster content, a method of image compression
 Molonglo Reference Catalogue of Radio Sources, an astronomical catalogue
 Multiple regression/correlation, a statistical method
 MRC (file format), originally created for storing electron microscopy data
 Memory Reference Code, a component of Intel computer firmware
 Memory Recall, a function key on a calculator
 .mrc, the common file extension for mIRC scripts

Scientific research
 Medical Research Council (disambiguation), any of several national medical research organizations
MRC Centre for Global Infectious Disease Analysis (MRC GIDA)
 Mekong River Commission

Other

 EmArcy, record label
 Maricopa (Amtrak station), Arizona, US, code
 MRC (company), US media company
 Mendocino Redwood Company, a forest products company
 Modern Records Centre, University of Warwick, archive service
 Morocco, ITU code
 Mount Royal College, now Mount Royal University
 Multi-Racing Championship, a Nintendo 64 video game
 mrc, the ISO 639 code for the Maricopa language
M.R. Chandrasekharan (born 1929), Indian literary critic

See also
 
 Mr. C (disambiguation)